Bicton is a village and civil parish in Shropshire, England. According to the 2001 census it had a population of 890, increasing to 1,092 at the 2011 Census.

The village is about three miles north-west of Shrewsbury town centre and includes part of Montford Bridge.

The parish includes the small primary Bicton school.

Notable people
Sir Richard Jenkins (1785-1853), Chairman of East India Company, MP for Shrewsbury, grew up at Bicton Hall.
Sam Aiston (born 1976), former professional footballer with Shrewsbury Town, began his teaching career at Bicton Primary School after retiring from play in 2010. 
Colin Bloomfield (1982-2015), radio personality, went to primary school in Bicton.

See also
Listed buildings in Bicton, Shrewsbury

References

External links

Parish webpage
Photos of Bicton and surrounding area on geograph.org.uk

Villages in Shropshire
Civil parishes in Shropshire